Where's Elvis This Week? was a short-lived, half-hour, weekly comedy talk show presented by Mike McShane in the pilot episode, and Jon Stewart for the remaining episodes, that aired on Sunday nights in the United Kingdom on BBC Two. It was filmed at the CBS Broadcast Center in New York City and featured a set of panellists—two from the United Kingdom, and two from the United States. The panellists discussed news items and cultural issues. It premiered in the United Kingdom on 31 May 1996, and six episodes aired in total. 

The 20 panellists from the 5 episodes which Jon Stewart presented include: Eddie Izzard, Laurie Pike, Scott Capurro, Phill Jupitus, Christopher Hitchens, Helen Gurley Brown, Tony Hawks, Dave Chappelle, Felix Dexter, Joe Queenan, Lowri Turner, Norm Macdonald, David Baddiel, Wendy Wasserstein, Martin Clunes, Ed Koch, Arthur Smith, Nora Ephron, Armando Iannucci, and Craig Kilborn.

Episodes

References

External links
 

1996 British television series debuts
1996 British television series endings
1990s British satirical television series
Criticism of journalism
BBC television talk shows
BBC television comedy
Cultural depictions of Elvis Presley